The Southeast Education Service Center (SESC) is located in Price, Utah.  SESC is one of four (SEDC, CUES and NUES) regional service centers in the State of Utah. SESC is a not-for-profit service center that supports the four public education school districts in Southeast Utah. SESC exists to provide services needed and requested by the schools/districts served.

The four school districts of Carbon County, Emery County, Grand County and San Juan County make up the Southeast Region of Utah. These four districts encompass 17,455 of Utah's , or 21% of the Utah's total area.

History
Utah's Regional Service Centers were founded in the 1970s and authorized by the Utah State Legislature under the direction of the Utah State Office of Education (USOE) rule R277-456-1.

Services
SESC provides the following requested services:

 Technology
 Regional Coordination
 Network Engineering
 Technical Support
 Integration Training
 Reading/Literacy Training and Support
 Instructional Media Distribution and Duplication
 Student Assessment Results Training and Support
 Educational Professional Development
 Grant Writing and Support

External links

Carbon School District Link
Emery School District Link
Grand School District Link
San Juan School District Link
Rural Utah Child Development Link

Educational charities based in the United States
Regional education units